Arnold Jonathan Bishop-Gooding (born 17 December 1950) is a Sierra Leonean lawyer, former attorney-general of Sierra Leone, and transport minister.

Early life and education
Arnold Jonathan Bishop-Gooding was born in Freetown, Sierra Leone to Sierra Leonean parents of Creole descent. He attended the Sierra Leone Grammar School and subsequently matriculated at Cambridge University, where he earned a Bachelor of Laws and Master of Laws at Christ's College, Cambridge.

Career
Bishop-Gooding returned to Sierra Leone and established the law firm, Gooding & Gooding. He was attorney-general of Sierra Leone and information minister under the NPRC government of Captain Valentine Strasser.

After returning to private practice, Bishop-Gooding also served as transport minister of Sierra Leone. He subsequently retired from public service and entered into private practice as a legal and business consultant at Selina House.

References

Sources
https://sl.usembassy.gov/wp-content/uploads/sites/195/Lawyers-List-Updated-December-2020.pdf
https://photos.state.gov/libraries/sierraleone/232497/Other/Lawyerlist_updated_October-2008.pdf
https://www.nytimes.com/1995/02/17/world/bandit-rebels-ravage-sierra-leone.html

20th-century Sierra Leonean lawyers
Sierra Leonean politicians
Sierra Leone Creole people
Alumni of the University of Cambridge
Attorneys-general of Sierra Leone
Government ministers of Sierra Leone
Alumni of Christ's College, Cambridge
1950 births
Living people
21st-century Sierra Leonean lawyers